David Magowan (born 4 October 1983) is a former footballer from Northern Ireland who played as a defender.

Club career
After being released after three years at Glentoran, 'Mags' joined Bangor, spending a successful season there, before signing for Crusaders in the summer of 2003. He initially established himself as first choice centre-back, but was loaned out to Comber Recreation in 2006, and it looked like his Crusaders days may have been at an end, yet managed to re-establish himself in the side.

He scored his first Crusaders goal on 20 December 2008 against Dungannon Swifts. and his second against Coleraine F.C. on 23 November 2013.
He missed the 2009 Irish Cup final due to suspension. Despite this, he was still named in the 2008–09 Irish League Team of the Year, along with teammates Colin Coates, Gareth McKeown, and Martin Donnelly.
He announced his retirement from football in June 2016

Honours

Club
Crusaders
NIFL Premiership (2): 2014–15, 2015–16
Irish Cup (1): 2008–09
Setanta Cup (1): 2012
Irish League Cup (1): 2011–12
County Antrim Shield (1): 2009–10
Irish First Division (1): 2005–06
IFA Intermediate League Cup (1): 2005–06
Steel & Sons Cup (1): 2005–06

Individual
Irish League Team of the Year (3): 2008–09, 2009–10, 2010–11

References

Living people
1983 births
Association footballers from Belfast
Association footballers from Northern Ireland
Association football midfielders
Bangor F.C. players
Crusaders F.C. players
NIFL Premiership players
Glentoran F.C. players